Lucas Moreira Neves O.P. (16 September 1925 – 8 September 2002) was a Brazilian Cardinal Bishop and Prefect of the Congregation for Bishops.

Biography
Moreira Neves was born in São João del Rei, in Minas Gerais state, Brazil. He was ordained a priest on 9 July 1950. He was appointed Auxiliary Bishop of São Paulo by Pope Paul VI on 9 June 1967 with the titular see of Feradi Maius.

On 15 October 1979 he was appointed secretary of the Congregation for Bishops within the Roman Curia by Pope John Paul II. Moreira Neves left the Curia to take up the position of Archbishop of São Salvador da Bahia on 9 July 1987.

He was created Cardinal-Priest of Ss. Bonifacio ed Alessio on 28 June 1988.

Moreira Neves once again left Brazil for Rome to take up the position of prefect of the Congregation for Bishops to which he was appointed on 25 June 1998, when he was also elevated to the rank of Cardinal Bishop of Sabina-Poggio Mirteto. He resigned his position as prefect on 16 September 2000 as a result of his failing health.

References

External links
GCatholic 

1925 births
2002 deaths
20th-century Roman Catholic archbishops in Brazil
Brazilian Dominicans
Brazilian cardinals
Dominican cardinals
Cardinal-bishops of Sabina
Neves
Members of the Congregation for Bishops
Pontifical Commission for Latin America
Cardinals created by Pope John Paul II
Roman Catholic bishops of São Paulo
Brazilian Roman Catholic archbishops